Rexy Ronald Mainaky (born 9 March 1968) is a former men's doubles badminton world champion from Indonesia who is often simply known as Rexy. He won the men's doubles Olympic gold medal in 1996 with Ricky Subagja. As of October 2021, he was appointed as the new deputy coaching director of the Badminton Association of Malaysia.

Career 
During the 1990s Mainaky and fellow countryman Ricky Subagja formed the most internationally successful team of the decade. Both noted for their quickness and power, Mainaky and Subagja won over thirty international titles together, including all of badminton's major championships at least once. They captured Olympic gold at Atlanta in 1996, the then biennial IBF World Championships in 1995 at Lausanne, Switzerland, and the venerable All-England Championships back to back in 1995 and 1996. A partial listing of their victories includes the China (1992), Indonesia (1993, 1994, 1998, 1999), Malaysia (1993, 1994, 1997), Korea (1995, 1996), and Denmark (1998) Opens; the World Badminton Grand Prix (1992, 1994, 1996), the Badminton World Cup (1993, 1995, 1997), and the quadrennial Asian Games (1994, 1998).

Mainaky and Subagja were bronze medalists at the 1997 IBF World Championships in Glasgow. They were eliminated in the quarterfinals at both the 1992 and 2000 Olympics. Mainaky won the 2000 Asian Badminton Championships with another Indonesian doubles maestro, Tony Gunawan. He was a member of consecutive world champion Indonesian Thomas Cup (men's international) teams in 1994, 1996, 1998, and 2000.

He is currently the doubles director of coaching of the Badminton Association of Malaysia.

Awards and nominations

Achievements

Olympic Games 
Men's doubles

World Championships 
Men's doubles

World Cup 
Men's doubles

Asian Games 
Men's doubles

Asian Championships 
Men's doubles

Asian Cup 
Men's doubles

Southeast Asian Games 
Men's doubles

Mixed doubles

IBF World Grand Prix (27 titles, 9 runners-up)
The World Badminton Grand Prix sanctioned by International Badminton Federation (IBF) since 1983.

Men's doubles

 IBF Grand Prix tournament
 IBF Grand Prix Finals tournament

IBF International (1 runners-up)
Men's doubles

Post-playing career 
Mainaky is known amongst his peers and colleagues, and the game's fans, as one of the greatest doubles player of all time, alongside players such as Park Joo Bong, Kim Dong Moon, Tony Gunawan, Christian Hadinata, Tjun Tjun and Finn Kobbero. He is regarded as one of the best coaches in the world, alongside former player Park Joo Bong of Korea (currently head coach of Japanese badminton squad). He is noted for his charity work through badminton, by playing in exhibitions across Asia and Europe post-competitive career. He was the coach to English badminton mixed doubles' pair Gail Emms and Nathan Robertson and successfully brought them winning the 2004 Summer Olympic silver medal, 2005 All England Open Badminton Championships and 2006 IBF World Championships titles.

Mainaky became a coach after his playing career. He coached the Malaysian National Team's Doubles department and his biggest success was bringing up Koo Kien Keat and Tan Boon Heong. He guided the pair to an Asian Games Gold Medal in Doha 2006. However, there was rumours about a fall out between Koo Kien Keat and Tan Boon Heong with Rexy as the pair requested for a change of coaches. Subsequently, he left the Badminton Association of Malaysia in 2012 after seven years and joined the Philippines Badminton Association as head coach. After about a year he left the Philippines Badminton Association and returned to his homeland Indonesia. He became Indonesia's high performance director and was basically the head of the Indonesia Badminton Team. He is currently still serving as the High performance director for Indonesia. In 2017, Mainaky left his position at Badminton Association of Indonesia (PBSI) to join Thailand Badminton Association (BAT). In 2018, Mainaky led the Thai women's team reached the Uber Cup final for the first time in their history.

References

Sources 
 PBSI: Rexy Mainaky profile

External links 
 Profile at koni.or.id
 Rexy Mainaky Dua Tahun Lagi di Malaysia 
 
 

Living people
1968 births
People from Ternate
Sportspeople from North Maluku
Indonesian male badminton players
Indonesian Christians
Badminton players at the 1992 Summer Olympics
Badminton players at the 1996 Summer Olympics
Badminton players at the 2000 Summer Olympics
Olympic badminton players of Indonesia
Olympic gold medalists for Indonesia
Olympic medalists in badminton
Medalists at the 1996 Summer Olympics
Badminton players at the 1994 Asian Games
Badminton players at the 1998 Asian Games
Asian Games gold medalists for Indonesia
Asian Games medalists in badminton
Medalists at the 1994 Asian Games
Medalists at the 1998 Asian Games
Competitors at the 1995 Southeast Asian Games
Southeast Asian Games silver medalists for Indonesia
Southeast Asian Games medalists in badminton
World No. 1 badminton players
Badminton coaches